The siege of Fort Massachusetts (19-20 August 1746) was a successful siege of Fort Massachusetts (in present-day North Adams, Massachusetts) by a mixed force of more than 1,000 French and Native Americans from New France.  The fort, garrisoned by a disease-weakened militia force from the Province of Massachusetts Bay, surrendered after its supplies of ammunition and gunpowder were depleted.  Thirty prisoners were taken and transported back to Quebec, where about half of them died in captivity.

References

Niles, Grace Graylock. The Hoosac Valley: its Legends and its History

Military history of New England
Military history of Canada
Conflicts in 1746
Battles in Massachusetts
Battles involving Great Britain
Sieges involving France
Sieges of the War of the Austrian Succession
Siege of Fort Massachusetts
New France
1746 in North America
Battles of King George's War